The districts of Kenya were divided into 262 divisions (matarafa). Divisions of Kenya were further subdivided into locations. Today's counties of Kenya are based on the merging of some of the districts on this list and since the divisions are one level under the districts they are now the sub-counties. This is because Kenya recently changed its constitution and 47 Counties emerged. Here are the divisions listed below, by district (before the change in administration):

Baringo District
Kabarnet
Kabartonjo
Marigat
Mochongoi
Mogotio
Nginyang
Ravine
Tenges

Bomet District
Bomet
Chepalungu
Konoin

Bondo District

Bungoma District
Cheptaisi
Kanduyi
Kapsokwony
Kimilili
Mt.elgon Forest
Sirisia
Tongareni
Webuye

Buret District

Busia
Teso North
Teso South
Amukura
Budalangi
Butula
Funyula
Nambale
Matayos

Butere/Mumias District

Embu District
Central
Nembure 
Manyatta 
Runyenjes 
Kyeni 
Gachoka
Mwea 
Makima 
Kiritiri 
Evurore 
Siakago

Garissa District
Bura
C_garissa
Dadaab
Hulugho
kulan
Jarajila
Masalani
Mbalambala
Modogashe
sankuri
danyere
shant-abak

Etago
Kenyenya
Nyacheki
Nyamache
Nyamarambe
Ogembo
Sameta

Homa Bay District
Kendu Bay
Mbita
Ndhiwa
Oyugis
Rangwe

Ijara District
Hulugho
Ijara
Masalani
Sangailu

Isiolo District
Central Isiolo
Garba Tulla
Merti
Sericho

Kajiado District
Central Kajiado
Loitokitok
Magadi
Ngong
Mashuru

Kakamega District
Butere
Ikolomani
Khwisero
Lugari
Lurambi
Malava/kabras
Mumias
Shinyalu

Keiyo District

Chepkorio
Soy
Metkei

Kericho District
Belgut
Bureti
Kipkelion
Ainamoi
Soin
Sigowet

Kiambu District
Gatundu (Gatundu North and Gatundu South)
Githunguri
Kiambaa
Kikuyu
Lari
Limuru
Thika- Juja

Kilifi District
The original Kilifi District (County) has since been split to five districts:
Kilifi
Ganze
Malindi
Magarini
Kaloleni
Rabai

Kilifi District now has the following divisions:
Bahari
Kikambala
Chonyi

Ganze district has these divisions:
Ganze
Bamba
Vitengeni

While Kaloleni Division was recently split into two districts:
Kaloleni
Rabai

Malindi division also was upgraded to district and later split into two districts:
Malindi
Magarini

Kirinyaga District
Gichugu
kirinyaga central
Mwea
Ndia

Kisii Central
Bosongo
Irianyi
Kisii Municipality
Marani
Masaba
Nyamache
Ogembo
Suneka

Kisumu District
Kisumu Township
Kisumu Central
Kisumu East
Kisumu North
Kisumu Southwest
Kajulu East
Kajulu West
Central Kolwa
East Kolwa
West Kolwa

Kitui District
Central Kitui
Kwa-vonza
Kyuso
Mutito
Mutomo
Mwingi

Koibatek District

Kuria East District

Kuria West District

Kwale District
Kinango
Matuga
LungaLunga
Msambweni

Laikipia District
Central Laikipia
Mukogondo
Ng'arua
Rumuruti

Lamu District
Amu
Faza
Kiunga
Mpeketoni
Witu

Lugari District

Machakos District
Central Machakos
Kangundo
Kathiani
Masinga
Mwala
Yatta

Makueni District
Kibwezi
Kilome
Makueni
Mbooni
Tsavo West National Park

Malindi District
Malindi
Magarini

Mandera District
Banissa
Central Mandera
Elwak
Fino
Rhamu
Takaba

Maragua District

Marakwet District
Tot
Tunyo
Tirap
Chepyemit
Kapcherop

Marsabit District
Central Marsabit
Laisamis
Loiyangalani
Moyale
North Horr
Sololo

Mbeere District

Meru Central District
Central Imenti
Igembe
Meru National Park
Mount Kenya Forest
North Imenti
Ntonyiri
South Imenti
Tigania
Timau

Meru North District

Meru South District

Migori District
Kehancha
Migori
Nyatike
Rongo

Mombasa District
Changamwe
Kisauni
Likoni
 Mvita

Mount Elgon District
Kaptama
Kapsokwony
Kopsiro
Cheptais

Moyale District

Murang'a District
Gatanga
Kandara
Kangema
Kigumo
Kiharu
Makuyu

Mutomo District

Mwingi District

Nairobi District
Central Nairobi
Dagoretti
Embakasi
Kasarani
Lang'ata
Makadara
Westlands
Pumwani

Nakuru District
Bahati
Gilgil
Mbogoini
Molo
Naivasha
Municipality_nakuru
Njoro
Olenguruone
Rongai
Keringet

Nandi
Aldai
Kapsabet
Kilibwoni
Mosop
Tindiret

Narok District
MARA
Mau
Olokurto
Osupuko
Ololulunga
MULOT
Loita

Nyamira District
Borabu
Ekerenyo
Magombo
Nyamira

Nyandarua District
Kinangop
Kipipiri
Ndaragwa
Ol Joro Orok
Ol-kalou

Nyando District
Muhoroni
Upper Nyakach
Lower Nyakach
Nyando
Miwani

Nyeri District
Aberdare Forest/National Park
Kieni East
Kieni West
Mathira
Mount Kenya Forest/National Park
Mukurweini
Nyeri Municipality
Othaya
Tetu

Rachuonyo District
West Karachuonyo
East Karachuonyo
Kasipul
Kabondo

Samburu District
Baragoi
Lorroki
Wamba
Waso

Siaya District
Bondo
Boro
Rarieda
Ugunja
Ukwala
Yala

Suba District
Suba South

Suba North

Taita-Taveta District
Mwatate
Taveta
Tsavo East National Park
Tsavo West National Park
Voi
Wundanyi

Tana River District
Bangale
Bura
Galole
Garsen
Kipini
Madogo
Wenje

Teso District
	Chakol
Amagoro
Amukura
Ang’urai

Tharaka District

Thika District
Gatanga
Gatundu
Kamwangi (Gatundu North)
Kakuzi
Municipality
Ruiru

Trans Mara District

Trans Nzoia District
Cherangani
Kwanza
Saboti
Kitale
Kiminini

Turkana District
Central (Kalokol)
Kakuma
Katilu
Kibish
Lake Turkana
Lokitaung
Lokori
Turkwel

Uasin Gishu District
Ainabkoi
Kesses
Moiben
Soy
Eldoret
Matunda
Moi's Bridge

Vihiga District
Emuhaya
Hamisi
Sabatia
Vihiga
Mbale
Majengo
Chavakali

Wajir District
Buna
Bute
Central Wajir
Griftu
Habaswein
Wajir-bor

West Pokot District
Alale
Chepareria
Kacheliba
Kapenguria
Sigor

The divisions are subdivided into approximately 1,088 "locations" (mtaa) and then "sublocations" (kata ndogo). A province is administered by a Provincial Commissioner (PC).

Kenyan local authorities mostly do not follow common boundaries with divisions. They are classified as City, Municipality, Town or County councils.

A third discrete type of classification are constituencies. They are further subdivided into wards.

See also
Provinces of Kenya
Districts of Kenya

Subdivisions of Kenya
Kenya, Divisions
Kenya 2
Kenya geography-related lists